The Mystery of No. 47 is a 1917 American silent comedy thriller film directed by Otis B. Thayer and starring Ralph C. Herz, Nellie Hartley and Casson Ferguson. It is an adaptation of the 1912 novel of the same title by British writer J. Storer Clouston.

Synopsis
Irwin Molyneux hosts a dinner party for the Bishop of Bedford. However when the cook unexpectedly disappears his wife steps in to prepare the dinner, and Molyneux pretends that his wife is away. This leads, through a series of misunderstandings, to Molyneux being sought by Scotland Yard for the murder of both his cook and wife.

Cast
 Ralph C. Herz as Irwin Molyneux
 Nellie Hartley as Harriet
 Louiszita Valentine as Eva Wilson 
 Edgar Murray Jr. as Lord Francis Phillamore
 James F. Fulton as Bishop of Bedford 
 Frederick Eckhart as Inspector Bray 
 Casson Ferguson as 	Buffington
 Margaret A. Wiggin as Aunt Margaret 
 Lloyd Sedgwick as Fitzroy Jones
 Tony West as Cadbury
 May White as Jane

References

Bibliography
 Connelly, Robert . Motion Picture Guide Silent Film 1910-1936. Cinebooks, 1988.
 Goble, Alan. The Complete Index to Literary Sources in Film. Walter de Gruyter, 1999.

External links
 

1917 films
1917 comedy films
1910s English-language films
American silent feature films
Silent American comedy films
Films directed by Otis B. Thayer
American black-and-white films
Selig Polyscope Company films
Films set in London
Films based on British novels
1910s American films